Wu Junhao (born 11 December 2004) is a Chinese footballer currently playing as a midfielder for Guangzhou.

Career statistics

Club
.

References

2004 births
Living people
Chinese footballers
Association football midfielders
Guangzhou F.C. players